Takht is a village in Jirestan Rural District, Sarhad District, Shirvan County, North Khorasan Province, Iran. At the 2006 census, its population was 119, in 27 families.

References 

Populated places in Shirvan County